This article contains information about the literary events and publications of 1697.

Events
May 7 – The 13th century royal Tre Kronor ("Three Crowns") castle in Stockholm burns to the ground and a large portion of the royal library is destroyed.
The actors of the Comédie-Italienne in Paris announce a performance of La fausse prude (The False Hypocrite), a play that ridicules King Louis XIV of France's wife, Françoise d'Aubigné, Marquise de Maintenon, which causes the King to disband the company.
George Farquhar arrives in London from Dublin.
Thomas Corneille publishes his translation of Ovid's Metamorphoses into French.
Daniel Defoe's An Essay Upon Projects suggests insurance, an income tax and the education of women, among other public measures.
First publication of the 13th century Heimskringla in Old Norse, with Swedish and Latin translations by Johan Peringskiöld in Stockholm

New books

Prose
Mary Astell – A Serious Proposal to the Ladies, Part II
Pierre Bayle –  (Historical and Critical Dictionary, first part, publication continued until 1702)
Richard Blackmore – King Arthur
Thomas Burnet – Remarks upon An Essay Concerning Humane Understanding (on John Locke)
William Congreve – The Birth of the Muse
William Dampier – A New Voyage Round the World
Daniel Defoe – An Essay Upon Projects
John Dryden
Alexander's Feast; or, The Power of Musique (ode)
The Works of Virgil
John Evelyn – Numismata: A discourse of medals
Jane Lead – A Fountain of Gardens
John Locke
A Letter to the Right Reverend Edward Ld Bishop of Worcester
Mr Locke's Reply to the Right Reverend the Lord Bishop of Worcester's Answer to his Letter
A Second Vindication of the Reasonableness of Christianity
Charles Perrault (as Pierre Perrault Darmancourt) –  (Tales and Stories of the Past with Morals: Tales of Mother Goose)
John Phillips – 
Humphrey Prideaux – The True Nature of Imposture Fully Display'd in the Life of Mahomet
John Wilmot, Earl of Rochester – Familiar Letters
William Wotton – Reflections upon Ancient and Modern Learning (setting off the English "quarrel of the Ancients and Moderns")

Drama
Anonymous (A Young Lady) – The Unnatural Mother
Colley Cibber – Woman's Wit
William Congreve – The Mourning Bride
John Dennis – A Plot and No Plot
Thomas Dilke – The City Lady, or Folly Reclaimed
Thomas D'Urfey
Cinthia and Endimion (opera)
The Intrigues at Versailles; or, A Jilt in all Humours
 James Drake – The Sham Lawyer
Charles Gildon – The Roman Brides Revenge
Charles Hopkins – Boadicea, Queen of Britain
Peter Anthony Motteux – The Novelty, or Every Act a Play
Mary Pix
The Deceiver Deceiv'd
The Innocent Mistress
George Powell – The Imposture Defeated, or a Trick to Cheat the Devil
Jacques Pradon – Scipion
Elkanah Settle – The World in the Moon
John Vanbrugh
Aesop
The Provoked Wife
The Relapse (performed 1696, published 1697)

Births
April 1 - Abbé Prévost, French writer (died 1763)
June 16 – Jean-Baptiste de La Curne de Sainte-Palaye, French historian, classicist and lexicographer (died 1781)
December 27 – Sollom Emlyn, Irish legal writer (died 1754)

Deaths
February 5 – Hester Biddle (Esther Biddle), English Quaker writer (born c. 1629)
March 1 – Francesco Redi, Tuscan physician, naturalist and poet (born 1626)
June 7 – John Aubrey, English memoirist (born 1626)
December 9 – Scipion Abeille, French surgeon and poet (year of birth unknown)
Unknown date – Juan del Valle y Caviedes, Spanish Peruvian poet (born 1645)
Probable year of death – Gilbert Clerke, English mathematician, natural philosopher and theologian (born 1626)

References

 
Years of the 17th century in literature